Sprucegrove Investment Management Limited was founded in 1993.

A privately held, Toronto-based company (Ontario, Canada), Sprucegrove Investment Management Limited is owned by its employees. They manage in excess of CAD $20 billion, including CAD $10 billion for American clients.

Sprucegrove is one of several successful international and global equity managers located in Toronto. 

Sprucegrove uses a value investing philosophy not completely dissimilar from an investor like Warren Buffett. It aims to identify high quality companies in hope of making purchases at reasonable to attractive valuations.

The company name references the founder's original family farm: Sprucegrove.

Investment management companies of Canada